This page lists board and card games, wargames, miniatures games, and tabletop role-playing games published in 2017.  For video games, see 2017 in video gaming.

Games released or invented in 2017
 The 7th Continent
 Azul
 Bärenpark
Bears vs. Babies
Charterstone
 Civilization: A New Dawn
 Dark Souls – The Board Game
 Feudum
 Gaslands
 Gloomhaven
Legend of the Five Rings: The Card Game
Near and Far
 Planetarium
 Spirit Island
 Werewords

Game awards given in 2017
 Great Western Trail won the Spiel Portugal Jogo do Ano.

Significant games-related events in 2017
On December 26, 2017, Steve Jackson announced he had re-acquired rights to The Fantasy Trip products he authored for Metagaming, specifically Melee, Wizard, Death Test, Death Test 2, Advanced Melee, Advanced Wizard, In the Labyrinth, and Tollenkar's Lair.

Deaths

See also
List of game manufacturers
2017 in video gaming

References

Games
Games by year